Vice Admiral James Mighells (died 21 March 1734) was a Royal Navy officer who became Comptroller of the Navy.

Naval career
Mighells was given command of HMS Monck and distinguished himself in a sea battle off Málaga in 1704. He commanded an expedition off the coast of Spain in 1719 during the War of the Quadruple Alliance. He commanded the naval contingent in the Raid on Vigo, a naval descent on the Spanish port town of Vigo. The land forces were under the command of Lord Cobham who successfully occupied Vigo and sent forces into the surrounding countryside.

In 1722 he was appointed Comptroller of the Navy. He died on 21 March 1734 and is buried in Lowestoft Church.

References

1733 deaths
Royal Navy vice admirals
Year of birth unknown
British military personnel of the War of the Quadruple Alliance